Monoplex nicobaricus, known as the Nicobar hairy triton or goldmouth triton, is a species of medium-sized predatory sea snail, a tropical marine gastropod mollusc in the family Cymatiidae.

Distribution
This species of marine snail has a wide distribution and lives in the Indo-Pacific and Western Atlantic oceans. Regions where Monoplex nicobaricus is found include Aldabra, Brazil, Canaries, Cape Verde, Chagos, Costa Rica, European waters, Florida, Gulf of Mexico, Mascarene Basin and West Indies.

Description
The maximum recorded shell length is 90 mm.

Habitat 

References

Further reading 
 Curtiss A. (1938) A short zoology of Tahiti in the Society Islands. [Published by the Author]. Printed by Guide Printing, Brooklyn, New York, xvi + 193 pp.
 Abbott R. T. (1974). American Seashells, second edition. Van Nostrand Rheinhold, New York, 
 Beu A.G. 2010 [August]. Neogene tonnoidean gastropods of tropical and South America: contributions to the Dominican Republic and Panama Paleontology Projects and uplift of the Central American Isthmus. Bulletins of American Paleontology 377-378: 550 pp, 79 pls

External links
 
 Image of live individual in Hawaii
  Röding, P.F. (1798). Museum Boltenianum sive Catalogus cimeliorum e tribus regnis naturæ quæ olim collegerat Joa. Fried Bolten, M. D. p. d. per XL. annos proto physicus Hamburgensis. Pars secunda continens Conchylia sive Testacea univalvia, bivalvia & multivalvia. Trapp, Hamburg. viii, 199 pp
 Lamarck, J.-B. M. de. (1822). Histoire naturelle des animaux sans vertèbres. Tome septième. Paris: published by the Author, 711 pp.
 Adams, C. B. (1850). Descriptions of supposed new species of marine shells, which inhabit Jamaica. Contributions to Conchology. vol. 1
 Mörch, O. A. L. (1877). Synopsis molluscorum marinorum Indiarum occidentalium imprimis insularum danicarum (contin.). Malakozoologische Blätter. 24: 14-66

Cymatiidae
Gastropods described in 1798
Molluscs of the Atlantic Ocean
Molluscs of the Indian Ocean
Molluscs of Brazil
Gastropods of Cape Verde